Wolfgang Knaller (born 9 October 1961), is an Austrian football goalkeeper, who played mostly for Admira Wacker and Austria Wien.

Club career
Knaller started his Austrian Football Bundesliga career with SV Spittal an der Drau in 1984 and has played professionally for over 20 years. In 2006, he joined lower league FC Waidhofen/Ybbs and in 2007 he moved to ASK Baumgarten.

International career
He made his debut for Austria in an October 1991 European championship qualification match against Northern Ireland and was a participant at the 1998 FIFA World Cup. He earned 4 caps. His last international was a May 1996 friendly match against the Czech Republic.

Personal life
Knaller was born in Waiern, Feldkirchen in Kärnten.  His brother Walter, a striker, scored 126 Austrian Bundesliga goals from 1980 through 1992. His son Marco is also a goalkeeper.

References

External links
 Profile - Austria Archive
 

1961 births
Living people
People from Feldkirchen in Kärnten
Association football goalkeepers
Austrian footballers
Austria international footballers
1998 FIFA World Cup players
FC Admira Wacker Mödling players
FK Austria Wien players
LASK players
Austrian Football Bundesliga players
Footballers from Carinthia (state)